Luca Ghiringhelli (born 23 January 1992) is an Italian professional footballer who plays for Serie B club Ternana as a defender.

Club career

Early career 
Born in Pavia, Ghiringhelli started playing football with local amateur team Don Orione, before joining Milan in 2002. He spent nine seasons in the club's youth system and he was a member of the under-20 side who won the Coppa Italia Primavera in 2010, 25 years after the team's last success in the competition.

SPAL 
At the beginning of the 2011–12 season, Ghiringhelli moved to Prima Divisione club SPAL in a co-ownership deal. He made a total of 22 league appearances for the club. At the end of the season, the co-ownership was resolved in favour of Milan via a blind auction.

Novara 
For the 2012–13 season, Ghiringhelli joined Serie B side Novara, once again in a co-ownership deal with Milan. He scored his first goal with Novara in the match Novara - Empoli.

Juve Stabia 
On 18 June 2013, Milan bought out the full ownership rights of Ghiringhelli. On 1 July 2013 Ghiringhelli joined Serie B club S.S. Juve Stabia in a definitive deal.

Pavia
In summer 2014 Ghiringhelli joined Lega Pro club Pavia on a free transfer.

Reggiana 
On 11 July 2016, he signed for fellow Serie C team Reggiana on a free transfer.

Ternana
On 9 June 2021, he joined Ternana on a three-year contract.

International career 
Ghiringhelli won a total of seven caps with Italy U-19 between 2010 and 2011.

References

External links 
 Profile at aic.football.it 
 International Caps at figc.it 

1992 births
Sportspeople from Pavia
Living people
Italian footballers
Italy youth international footballers
Association football defenders
A.C. Milan players
S.P.A.L. players
Novara F.C. players
S.S. Juve Stabia players
F.C. Pavia players
A.C. Reggiana 1919 players
A.S. Cittadella players
Ternana Calcio players
Serie B players
Serie C players
Footballers from Lombardy